Czesław Bolesław "Chester" Marcol (born October 24, 1949) is a former professional American football player. A placekicker for the Green Bay Packers from 1972 to 1980, he was inducted into the Green Bay Packers Hall of Fame in 1987.

Early years
Marcol lived in Poland until the age of 14, when his father committed suicide, forcing Marcol's mother to send their family to the United States. He attended Imlay City High School in Michigan without much knowledge of the English language. In Poland, Marcol had great kicking abilities in soccer. His gym teacher discovered his talent and showed him the game of football. He attended Hillsdale College where he was named NAIA All-American and holds the record for longest field goal.

Professional career
Marcol was selected by Green Bay Packers coach Dan Devine in the second round of the 1972 NFL Draft. He scored 128 points his rookie year, leading the league in scoring, and he was named NFC Rookie of the Year — the only kicker to have received that honor — and an All-Pro.  He again led the league in scoring and was named an All-Pro and Pro Bowler in 1974.

Marcol may best be known for his game-winning touchdown against the Chicago Bears on September 7, 1980. On opening day of the 1980 NFL season, the Packers were tied 6–6 with the Bears in overtime. A 32-yard pass from Lynn Dickey to James Lofton helped set up a 34-yard field goal attempt to win the game for the Packers. Marcol's kick was blocked by Alan Page and deflected straight back to Marcol. He caught the ball, ran around left end and was able to make it 25 yards into the end zone to give the Packers a 12–6 victory.  He later acknowledged that he was high on cocaine during the game's second half.

Marcol was cut by head coach Bart Starr on October 8, 1980, following a rough game against the Cincinnati Bengals. Starr said Marcol was cut because of poor kickoffs, but Marcol felt it was because of his cocaine use. He signed with the Houston Oilers when they came to Green Bay for a game on December 14, 1980. It was determined very late that week that Oilers kicker Toni Fritsch would be unable to play. Marcol was in Green Bay, so the Oilers claimed him off waivers. He kicked one field goal and made only one of three PATs in a 22–3 Houston win.  Marcol remained with the Oilers for the rest of the season, but did not play again due to Fritsch's return.

Post-football years
On 14 February 1986, Marcol attempted suicide by drinking a mixture of battery acid, rat poison, and vodka, which severely damaged his esophagus. He had his esophagus stretched as treatment.

Marcol is a resident of the Upper Peninsula community of Dollar Bay, Michigan. He has a wife and three children.  He slowly recovered from his addictions, but still suffers from hepatitis C and a heart condition.  He works on weekends as a drug and alcohol abuse counselor near his home.

Marcol published a memoir in September 2011 entitled Alive and Kicking: My Journey Through Football, Addiction and Life. He discusses his childhood, immigration to the United States, playing for the Packers, and his fall from grace.

References

Living people
1949 births
21st-century memoirists
21st-century Polish male writers
American football placekickers
Green Bay Packers players
Hillsdale Chargers football players
Houston Oilers players
National Conference Pro Bowl players
People from Imlay City, Michigan
Sportspeople from Opole
Sportspeople from Metro Detroit
Players of American football from Michigan
Polish players of American football
Polish emigrants to the United States
Polish memoirists